The Estonian Operation of the NKVD was a mass arrest, execution and deportations of persons of Estonian origin in the Soviet Union by the NKVD during the period of Great Purge (1937–1938). It was a part of the larger mass operations of the NKVD which targeted many minority nationalities in the Soviet Union. A total of 4,672 were  killed during the repression.

References

Political repression in the Soviet Union
Great Purge
NKVD
Massacres in the Soviet Union
1937 in the Soviet Union
1938 in the Soviet Union
Mass murder in 1937
Mass murder in 1938